The Goa Institute of Management (abbreviated as GIM-Goa), is one of the top business school of India located near Sanquelim in city of North Goa district in the state of Goa.

The autonomous school is governed by a board, and offers a full-time MBA (PGDM) program (2 years), PGDM -Healthcare Management Programme (HCM-2 years), PGDM in Big Data Analytics (BDA - 2 years), PGDM in Banking, Insurance & Financial Services (BFIS - 2-year) and Part Time Executive MBA (3 years). It has a full-time "Fellow Programme in Management" (FPM) which is a doctoral programme ideal for individuals seeking academic research and teaching careers as faculty or professors. GIM also conducts Management Development Programs/Corporate trainings for various MNC's, Public & Private sector companies.

History
Goa Institute of Management was founded in 1993 when Romuald D'Souza who had also served as the Director of XLRI – Xavier School of Management Jamshedpur and Xavier Institute of Management, Bhubaneswar moved out to create a centre of Learning and Excellence in Goa.

GIM began its journey with a modest setting of one classroom at the V. M. Salgaocar College of Law and a batch size of 35 students.

Campus

Ribandar Campus (1993-2009) 
Gradually, as the popularity of the programme grew with the student community,  the campus was shifted to the heritage building in Ribandar Conservation Area. It was here in the same campus that the Institute really flourished while offering their flagship Postgraduate diploma in Management.

This was a beautiful 350 yr old heritage campus was situated on the banks of the serene Mandovi River, in the Santa Casa de Misericordia in Ribandar. The building in which the school was is now an heritage conservation area and is under the care of Government of Goa. The 2011 batch was the last full-time batch to graduate from this campus.

Sanquelim Campus (2009-present) 
In 2009, the Institute shifted to a sprawling campus in the lap of nature at Sanquelim. This 50 acre campus providing a well-developed interior and exterior and is eco friendly and has a state of the art solar power generation facility to meet the energy requirements of the campus. The water treatment plant ensures retreated water is collected in a common pool and is utilized for maintenance. The pool also has its own flora and fauna with various types of fresh water fish and local birds. The new campus was inaugurated by Shri. Ashok Sekhar Ganguly, Rajya Sabha MP and former chairman of Hindustan Lever Ltd and Mla of Sanquelim Pratap Prabhakar Gauns.

Architecture 
The GIM Sanquelim campus was structured in such a way so as to enable conditions for interaction, collaboration and open dialogue. The architecture is characterized by vast corridors with room for ample daylight and fresh air. Its open ambience promotes collaboration and problem solving.

The task of designing the new GIM campus was given to Ms. Somaya & Kallapa, who have also designed the new complex of IIT Bombay & Birla Institute of Technology and Science, Pilani. Civil works contract was given to Ms. Vascon Engineers & Blue Star executed most of the HVAC works.

Location 
The campus is located in the quaint town of Sanquelim.in North Goa district of the Western state of Goa in India . It comes under the Poriem Panchayat Area. Some of the major tourism attractions near the campus are Harvalem Waterfalls, Chorla Ghat, Old Goa, Panaji City, Calangute beach.

Accommodation 

GIM has a fully residential programme and also has separate hostels for Boys and Girls. Faculty accommodation is also given on the Campus. There are total 7 hostels and students have a choice of Ac and Non-Ac rooms. Although, In the first-year twin sharing rooms are compulsory while single occupancy rooms are subject to availability.

Labs 
Data Labs: Lab has SAS Suite with Open-source software like R, R Studio, Python 3.7, Hadoop, Cloudera, CDH5.x, Tableau, Power BI, Oracle VM

Finance Lab: It has access to financial research tools such as Thomson Reuters Eikon, Prowess IQ of CMIE, ProQuest

Behavioral Lab: It is equipped with Tobii Technology, which assists marketers in analyzing behavioral data and patterns

Activities 
 GIM organizes TEDx, Seminars, conferences around the year for students.
 There are 26 student clubs. Students choose their club depending on their Interests.
 Ribandar Talks is their famous event where many motivational speakers and famous personalities are called sharing their knowledge with students.
 Inception is their main annual function. There are many such cultural events held in GIM.
 Freshers party, Convocation, Farewell, Music festival, Educational Trips, and so on are organized by the institute
 Students get to experience the local culture through their Give Goa Initiative.

Facilities 
Canteen/Cafeteria, Food Court, Convenience Store, Medical Facilities, Wi-Fi Campus, Open Auditorium, Multi-Purpose Hall, Meditation room.

Sports complex 
Consists of basketball court, swimming pool, cricket ground, football ground, lawn-tennis court, volleyball court, badminton etc.

Academics 
Goa Institute of Management was established in 1993. It is an autonomous institute governed by a board and is accredited to AICTE & National Board of Accreditation

Academic programmes 
GIM is an autonomous institute and offers PGDM (MBA), PGDM-PT and FPM. Its courses have been granted international accreditation by Association of MBAs (AMBA) & GSBN

PGDM (MBA) 
Post Graduate Diploma in Management is a two-year fully residential programme consisting of six terms. Students also pursue summer internship project spread over 8–10 weeks.

PGDM (MBA) in Healthcare Management 
This is a 2 years full time residential course and it was introduced in 2013. The Higher Education Review has rated GIM as top 10 most promising Healthcare Management Colleges in India

PGDM (MBA) in Big Data Analysis 
This course was introduced in 2018. A business analytics software & services SAS has announced its association with GIM for the Big Data Course. SAS and GIM hosted an event in which the teams analyzed COVID-19 data of several countries and arrived at a conclusion that COVID-19 will not be eradicated anytime soon and we must adhere to the norms and guidelines advised by the government and health agencies.

PGDM (MBA) in Banking Insurance & Financial Services (BIFS) 
This is also a 2-year fully residential course specializing in finance and related sectors. It has seen increasing affinity from the student community towards this course. The facilities for this course includes a finance lab, which is similar to a stock market trading floor so that students get practical experience in its operations. The course is good in terms of core finance knowledge skills those are imparted

PGDM - part time 
It is a three-year part time MBA programme for working professionals. The last year of the programme is assigned for dissertation and work improvement project. The officiating registrar of Goa University Dr. Radhika Nayak is one of their prominent Alumni of part time programme.

Fellow Programme in Management 
The programme is of four years and is aimed at training research scholars for a career in academia and practice. The program was launched in 2020 with an intake of 6 students.

Management development programmes 
GIM conducts customized management trainings for executives and employees of various MNCs, Public companies, Government employees etc. It also conducts open training programmes for executives.

Selection criteria 
Student has to appear for any one of the exams - XAT / CAT / GMAT / CMAT  Then they have to apply for admission via their website. Final selection of the student on the basis of academic performance, objective assessment, Personal Interview, composite diversity index & work experience etc. Candidates must have secured at least 50% aggregate marks (45% for SC/ST) in any degree course recognized by Association of Indian Universities / AICTE.

Rankings 

GIM-Goa was ranked 36 among business schools in India by the National Institutional Ranking Framework in 2022. It was ranked 11 by Outlook Indias "Top Private MBA Institutions In India" of 2022.

Awards 
 Ranked "Best for the World" Pioneering B-School In Positive Impact Rating
 2021 Flourish Prize for Global Goal #8
IMC Gold Award for Excellence in Management Education
International Green Gown Awards-Highly commended Institution of the year 2022
2022 Flourish Prize for Global Goal #6

Placements 
Every year companies come to the campus for placements. The institute has 100% placements record every year

International tie-ups 
Goa Institute of Management has international tie-ups with leading educational institutions

 University of Catolica, Portugal (AACSB, Equis, EFMD accredited) 
 University of Antwerp, Belgium (AACSB accredited)
 Kansas State University, USA (Higher Learning Commission (HLC) of the North Central Association of Colleges and Schools)
 Warsaw University of Technology Business School (WUTBS), Poland (EPAS accreditation)
 Lappeenranta University of Technology (LUT), Finland (EFMD accredited)
 Lisbon University Institute (ICSTE), Portugal (AACSB, AMBA)
 Sapir College, Israel (Institutional Accreditation, Ministry of Education, Israel)
 Colegio Universitario De Estudios Financieros (CUNEF), Spain
 The Institute of Higher Education in Management (HEM, Morocco; EFMD Member)
 North South University, Dhaka, Bangladesh (UGC, Bangladesh)

International exchange programs

International Consulting Bootcamp 
This ICB is an intensive two to four- week program. Students from the partner universities travel to India along with their professors to work on a live project. Collaborating partners are University of Antwerp & University of Dhaka.

The International Student Exchange Program 
GIM's student exchange programs enable students to study abroad for one term at its partner universities of

 Catolica Lisbon
 University of Antwerp 
 LUT University
 CUNEF
 HEM

The Country Immersion Program 
Currently, GIM students can travel to WUTBS, Poland for this program. WUTBS awards GIM students a completion certificate titled ‘Certificate in Business: A European Perspective’.

Warsaw University of Technology Business School

Atal Incubation Center 
The Atal Incubation Centre at Goa Institute of Management (AIC-GIM) was inaugurated by the honorable Chief Minister of Goa Dr. Pramod Sawant, on 26 February 2021. Atal Incubation Center at GIM has turbo charged more than 22+ Startups & conducted 35+ Startup ecosystem programs.

Centers of excellence

Center for Social Sensitivity and Action (CSSA) 
It is a center to promote social responsibility within and outside GIM. CSSA remains committed to the UN Sustainable Development Goals, Principles for Responsible Management Education (PRME) initiative and to the promotion of responsible management.

Centre For Creativity, Innovation And Design Thinking (CCIDT) 
They organize several workshops for photography, dance, theatre, doodling, along with competitions and events throughout the year to ensure that the students' gusto is always sky high.

Center for Excellence in Sustainable Development (CESD) 
Undertakes all the eco-friendly or environmental initiatives in GIM. It is also actively engaged in MSME and Government sustainability projects.

Center For Creativity, Innovation And Design Thinking (CCIDT) 
The centre works at multiple levels to provide students with ample opportunities to practice design thinking skills with the use of workshops, contests based on Howard Gardner's multiple intelligences

Center For Entrepreneurship Development (EDC) 
The aim of this center is to foster the spirit of entrepreneurship among students and community

Center for Teaching Excellence (TE@GIM) 
Center for Teaching Excellence at GIM promotes learning-centric pedagogical practices and innovations.

Center for Public Policy (CPP) 
The Center for Public Policy takes policy matters beyond the classroom and engages students in policy development projects involving public and private organizations.

Give Goa 
GIM inculcates in its students a sense of social responsibility through its CSR initiative ‘Give Goa’ which is a part of the course curriculum. Students work with various NGOs, understand the problems they are facing and help them with their cause.

The Give Goa initiative was started to promote social responsibility among the students of GIM through service to the less privileged communities and thereby contribute to goal of a more inclusive society. It is operationalized as a compulsory four-credit course in the first year of the PGDM program. The course has two components: a three-credit experiential project with partner organizations (such as banks and NGOs) and one-credit classroom learning experience.

Student clubs 
 Brain Vista - The Quiz Club
 Bitathon
 Entrepreneurship Cell (Ecell)
 GIM Agora Speakers International
 HRiday - HR Club
 i3 - Industry Institute Interaction Club
 Kshitiz - Creative and Literary Club
 MECCA - Marketing Club
 Parigyan - Data Science Society
 Prayas - Sports Club
 RaZzMaTaZz - The Cultural Club
 Samarthan
 Samriddhi
 Sankhya - The analytics club
 SCOPES - Supply Chain and Operations Club
 SOFIA - Society of Finance
 Sprokets - The Photography Club
 Student Alumni Relations Cell
 Student Public Relations Cell
 Students Advisory Council
 The Systems and Consulting Club
 Vinidhan - Student Investment Club
 Society for Public Policy
 Ribandar Talks

Speakers
GIM has had eminent personalities address the students. Some of the most recent speakers have been: 
 The Dalai Lama
Shiv Khera, Author
Anil Agarwal, founder and executive chairman, Vedanta Resources
 Prahlad Kakkar, film director
 Bjørn Lomborg, author of The Skeptical Environmentalist
 Piyush Pandey, executive chairman and national creative director Ogilvy & Mather India
 Anil D. Sahasrabudhe, Chairman- AICTE

References

External links

External links
 Official website

All India Council for Technical Education
Goa Institute of Management
Education in North Goa district
Educational institutions established in 1993
1993 establishments in Goa